CECT is one of the many brands of cellular phones manufactured in China. CECT offers unauthorized clones or replicas of the Apple Inc. iPhone and various Nokia cell phones manufactured in China and sold at a fraction of the price of the original. At least one reseller has been subject to legal demands from Apple Inc.

iPhone clones 

The CECT iPhone "clones" have been described as one of a growing number of Nucleus PLUS powered iPhone clones. Two of the differences between the clones and the Apple iPhone are that the "clones" normally  have smaller-resolution resistive touch screens (instead of capacitive) and dual SIM card slots. Newer models however, feature capacitive touch screens.

CECT 
CECT is one of the largest China-based mobile phone manufacturer. While most of the phones listed below origins are unknown, they are believed to be produced by CECT. One of CECT's original phones is the CECT T689.

HiPhone 
The HiPhone T32 is the only model in the Hiphone series to offer Wi-Fi. In many of the clone models, the only difference is firmware versions. Not all HiPhones are labeled by the manufacturer; some are labeled only by the software version w006 or w009.Please note the term "Sciphone" is often used to reference clone phones, because Sciphone is the manufacturer of the i68, i9, and more recently the i9+++.
Hiphone P168
Hiphone P168+
Hiphone P168++
Hiphone P168C
Hiphone P168S
Hiphone 4 (iPhone 4 clone)

Other 
Hiphone S688
Hiphone T32
Hiphone C-002 (also called Sciphone i32)
Sciphone BB9B (the included battery, the back cover and the earphones are compatible with the i9 and the i68 models)
Sciphone i68
Sciphone i68+ (features a 1.3-megapixel camera, features a 3,5 headphone jack and the capacity to add up to 8 gigabytes of external storage)
Sciphone i9+
Sciphone i9+++( features the 30 pin connector, a headphone jack and WI-FI)
Sciphone i999
Sciphone i9 3GS+
Sciphone 4G
Sciphone KA08
Ephone 4G
Ephone 4GS
J8
AirPhone 4

A series 
Sciphone A88
Sciphone A88+
Sciphone A380i

N series 
Sciphone N19
Sciphone N21 also known as X2 (a rebranded variant of General Mobile's DSTL1)
Sciphone N12

See also 
 Meizu M8

References 

Mobile phone manufacturers